Hellfire Pass is a railway cutting and war memorial in Thailand.

Hellfire Pass is also an alternative name for:
Bwlch y Groes in Wales
Halfaya Pass in Egypt

See also
Hellfire (disambiguation)